The 2022 Supercopa de España Final decided the winner of the 2021–22 Supercopa de España, the 38th edition of the annual Spanish football super cup competition. The match was played on 16 January 2022 at the King Fahd International Stadium in Riyadh, Saudi Arabia. The match was a clásico between 2020–21 Copa del Rey runners-up Athletic Bilbao and 2020–21 La Liga runners-up Real Madrid, the first time the clubs had met to directly compete for a trophy since the 1958 Copa del Generalísimo Final.

Real Madrid won the final 2–0 for their 12th Supercopa de España title.

Teams

Route to the final

Match

Details

Notes

References 

2022 Final
Sport in Riyadh
Supercopa de España Final
2022 in Spanish sport
Athletic Bilbao matches
Real Madrid CF matches
21st century in Riyadh